Exosphaeroma is a genus of marine isopod of the family Sphaeromatidae. This genus is found in shallow ocean waters worldwide. It is notable for being one of the few genera of sphaeromatid to be found in the southern reaches of the Southern Ocean. The greatest diversity of Exosphaeroma occurs in the Southern Hemisphere.

Species
The following species are recognised in the genus Exosphaeroma:

Exosphaeroma agmokara Bruce, 2003
Exosphaeroma alii Baker, 1926
Exosphaeroma alveola Bruce, 2003
Exosphaeroma amplicauda (Stimpson, 1857)
Exosphaeroma antarctica Richardson, 1906
Exosphaeroma antikraussi Barnard, 1940
Exosphaeroma aphrodita Boone, 1923
Exosphaeroma bicolor Baker, 1926
Exosphaeroma brevitelson Barnard, 1914
Exosphaeroma bruscai Espinosa-Pérez & Hendrickx, 2001
Exosphaeroma chilensis Dana, 1853
Exosphaeroma diminutum Menzies & Frankenberg, 1966
Exosphaeroma echinensis Hurley & Jansen, 1977
Exosphaeroma estuarium Barnard, 1951
Exosphaeroma falcatum Tattersall, 1921
Exosphaeroma gigas (Leach, 1818)
Exosphaeroma hylecoetes Barnard, 1940
Exosphaeroma inornata Dow, 1958
Exosphaeroma kraussi Tattersall, 1913
Exosphaeroma laevis (Baker, 1910)
Exosphaeroma laeviusculum (Heller, 1868)
Exosphaeroma media George & Stromberg, 1968
Exosphaeroma montis (Hurley & Jansen, 1977)
Exosphaeroma obtusum (Dana, 1853)
Exosphaeroma octoncum (Richardson, 1897)
Exosphaeroma pallidum Barnard, 1940
Exosphaeroma parva Chilton, 1924
Exosphaeroma paydenae Wall, Bruce & Wetzer, 2015
Exosphaeroma pentcheffi Wall, Bruce & Wetzer, 2015
Exosphaeroma planulum Hurley & Jansen, 1971
Exosphaeroma planum Barnard, 1914
Exosphaeroma porrectum Barnard, 1914
Exosphaeroma rhomburum (Richardson, 1899)
Exosphaeroma russellhansoni Wall, Bruce & Wetzer, 2015
Exosphaeroma serventii Baker, 1928
Exosphaeroma studeri Vanhöffen, 1914
Exosphaeroma truncatitelson Barnard, 1940
Exosphaeroma varicolor Barnard, 1914
Exosphaeroma waitemata Bruce, 2005

References

Sphaeromatidae
Taxa named by Thomas Roscoe Rede Stebbing